The 1993–1994 season was the 115th season in Bolton Wanderers F.C.'s existence, and their first season back in the Football League First Division for nine years following promotion from the Football League Second Division. It covers the period from 1 July 1993 to 30 June 1994.

Results

Endsleigh League First Division

F.A. Cup

Coca-Cola Cup

Anglo Italian Cup

Top scorers

References

Bolton Wanderers
Bolton Wanderers F.C. seasons